The Yueyang–Linwu Expressway commonly abbreviated as Yuelin Expressway, is an expressway in Hunan province, China that connects Yueyang and Linwu County. It is the section of G0421 Xuchang–Guangzhou Expressway in Hunan. Its northern terminus at Jingyue Yangtze River Bridge and its southern terminus at Huangsha Town of Yizhang County.

Route
The expressway passes the following major cities and countries:

 Yueyang County
 Miluo
 Xiangyin
 Xiangtan
 Wangcheng District
 Yuelu District
 Hengshan County
 Hengyang County
 Zhengxiang District
 Changning
 Guiyang County
 Jiahe County
 Linwu County
 Yizhang County
 Xintian County

Scenic spots
 Yueyang Tower
 Mount Heng (Hunan)
 Yuelu Mountain

References

Transport in Hunan
Expressways in Changsha
Expressways in Xiangtan
Expressways in Hengyang
2011 establishments in China